My Missing Valentine  is a 2020 Taiwanese romantic comedy film written and directed by Chen Yu-hsun, and starring Liu Kuan-ting, Patty Lee. The film was released in Taiwan on September 18, 2020, and it was selected for Open Cinema of the 25th Busan International Film Festival on October 29. It received 11 nominations at the 57th Golden Horse Awards, winning Best Feature Film, Best Original Screenplay, Best Visual Effects, Best Film Editing and Best Director for Chen.

Synopsis
A girl who does things so quickly that she's always one step ahead of others discovers that her Valentine's Day has mysteriously passed when she wakes up the next morning.

Cast
 Liu Kuan-ting as A Tai, a bus driver
 Patty Lee as Yang Hsiao-chi, a post officer
 Duncan Chow as Liu Wen-sen, a dance teacher
 Joanne Missingham as Ye Pei-wen, a post officer
 Ayugo Huang as Yang Hsiao-chi's father
 Heaven Hai as Scam victim

Awards and nominations

References

External links
 

2020s Mandarin-language films
2020 romantic comedy films
Taiwanese romantic comedy films
Films about buses
Films about postal systems
Films about time